Angie Aparo is an American musician and songwriter from Atlanta, Georgia.

Aparo began playing in a group called Angie's Hope in the early 1990s before making the decision to go solo. After making that decision, Aparo chose to go out on the road touring with his acoustic guitar in the Southeast. In 1996, he released his first CD Out of the Everywhere, recorded at David Briggs Studio in Nashville, Tennessee with Jim Stabile as engineer. Burnard Tate played drums.

In 1999, with Grammy-winning producer Matt Serletic, Aparo released The American.  His single, "Spaceship," hit the radio waves in 2000, and The American also includes his original version of the single "Cry", made popular by Faith Hill and featured on her album of the same name. Many songs from The American are also on a live CD 9Live that was released in 2004, from a performance for Atlanta radio station 99X, also featured on 99X Live X 6.  Faith Hill's husband Tim McGraw also covered "Free Man" from The American.  It was featured on an iTunes-only soundtrack release for an HBO documentary about the election of Barack Obama.

While stuck in musical limbo due to record label issues, Aparo released Weapon of Mass Construction (2001) (Later re-released under the title One With the Sun), a CD of cover songs taken from varying artists from Beastie Boys to Neil Young and Elton John, as well as two previously unreleased originals. In his own words, "It was fun, and I got it out of my system."

In 2003, he released another album, For Stars and Moon, a Beatles-influenced showcase, independently.

Aparo put together backing band The Infidels and toured the Southeast while recording a 2006's EP "El Primero Del Tres" (Spanish for "The First of the Three") with producer Dann Huff. The music moved in a different direction than his previous recordings. The Infidels consists of Derek Murphy (The American, 9Live, One With the Sun, For Stars and Moon, Praise Be), Mark Dannells, Martin Lesch (For Stars and Moon), and Shannon Woods.

In 2009, Aparo contributed the song "Junkyard" with the Zac Brown Band on their album Pass The Jar – Zac Brown Band And Friends From The Fabulous Fox Theatre in Atlanta (Live).

In April 2016, Aparo suffered torn carotid artery, which caused a stroke that initially immobilized him and rendered him unable to speak or remember his songs. He returned to the stage at Eddie's Attic in Atlanta after recuperating and rehabilitating for nearly 6 months. In February 2018 he released the album "Life Is a Flower, Life Is a Gun," a return to his pop form.

Discography
Out of the Everywhere (1996)
The American (1999)
Weapon of Mass Construction (also released under the title "One With the Sun") (2001)
For Stars and Moon (2003)
9Live (2004)
El Primero Del Tres (2006)
Praise Be (2006)
Life Is a Flower, Life Is a Gun (2018)

Band members
 Angie Aparo: Vocals
 Derek Murphy: Drums

References

External links
Angie Aparo collection at the Internet Archive's live music archive

American country singer-songwriters
American country rock singers
Musicians from Atlanta
Living people
Year of birth missing (living people)
Country musicians from Georgia (U.S. state)
Singer-songwriters from Georgia (U.S. state)